Leonor Maia, pseudonym of Maria da Conceição de Vasconcelos (8 December 1926 – 3 April 2010) was a Portuguese film actress active in the 1940s, best remembered for her role in The Tyrant Father. She retired from film in 1953. She was born in Lourenço Marques, now known as Maputo.

References

External links

1926 births
2010 deaths
Portuguese film actresses
People from Maputo